Jhojhu Khurd is a village in the Bhiwani district of Haryana state, India.Khurd and Kalan Persian language word which means small and Big respectively when two villages have same name then it is distinguished as Kalan means Big and Khurd means Small with Village Name.
The current sarpanch is Manoj Kumar A.k.A(Billu), the youngest village head to date.
Khurd and Kalan Persian language word which means small and Big respectively when two villages have same name then it is distinguished as Kalan means Big and Khurd means Small with Village Name.

References

Villages in Bhiwani district